Solace is the second studio album by the Canadian band Ion Dissonance, released on September 6, 2005 through Abacus Recordings. The album shows the band beginning to incorporate deathcore influences into their sound, while significantly reducing grindcore elements that the band more significantly featured on their earlier releases.

Track listing

Personnel
 Gabriel McCaughry – vocals
 Antoine Lussier − guitar
 Sebastien Chaput − guitar
 Xavier St-Laurent − bass
 Jean-François Richard − drums

References

2005 albums
Ion Dissonance albums